Bronwyn Lee Mayer-Smith  (born 3 July 1974 in Sydney) is an Australian water polo player from the gold medal squad of the 2000 Summer Olympics.

Mayer married Damian Smith in January 2001. Mayer competed on the team in the 2004 Summer Olympics, which took 4th place. She is a cousin of water polo players Gavin and Taryn Woods.

In 2019, she was inducted into the Water Polo Australia Hall of Fame.

See also
 Australia women's Olympic water polo team records and statistics
 List of Olympic champions in women's water polo
 List of Olympic medalists in water polo (women)
 List of World Aquatics Championships medalists in water polo

References

External links
 

1974 births
Living people
Australian female water polo players
Olympic gold medalists for Australia in water polo
Water polo players at the 2000 Summer Olympics
Water polo players at the 2004 Summer Olympics
Sportswomen from New South Wales
Water polo players from Sydney
Medalists at the 2000 Summer Olympics
Recipients of the Medal of the Order of Australia
21st-century Australian women
20th-century Australian women